Samuel Candler Dobbs (November 8, 1868 – October 31, 1950) was president (1919-1920) and chairman of The Coca-Cola Company, from 1919 to 1922.

Early life and education
Dobbs was born in 1868 in Georgia. He was the son of Harris Henry Dobbs, and cousin of Asa Griggs Candler, founder of The Coca-Cola Company.

Career
Dobbs began his career as an Atlanta-based Coca-Cola salesman, during which he persuaded Joe Biedenharn of the Biedenharn Candy Company to set up a Coca-Cola dispenser in this store and order the beverage on a regular basis, thereby fueling sales and recognition of the Coca-Cola name. Dobbs later became the company's sales manager and president.

In 1909, Dobbs became president of the Associated Advertising Clubs of America, now the American Advertising Federation (AAF), and began to make speeches on the subject.

Philanthropy and legacy
In January 1939, Dobbs made a $1,000,000 unrestricted gift to the Emory University.  Several endowed chairs are named after him.

References

American drink industry businesspeople
Coca-Cola people
1868 births
1950 deaths
Emory University people
American chairpersons of corporations
Candler family